Bull Run Fossil Plant, commonly known as Bull Run Steam Plant, is a 889 megawatt (MW), coal-fired electric generating station owned and operated by the Tennessee Valley Authority (TVA). The plant is the only coal fired power plant ever constructed by TVA with one unit, and is expected to close in 2023.

Location

History
Construction began on April 2, 1962 and was completed on June 12, 1967, when the plant began commercial operation.

In August 2018, TVA began studying whether to retire Bull Run. On February 14, 2019, the TVA board of directors voted 5-2 to close Bull Run by December 2023, as well as the remaining coal unit at Paradise in Kentucky by December 2020. High operational costs and low capacity factor were its factors in their decision.

Units and operating parameters
The plant is the only single-generator coal-fired plant in the TVA system. The plant's winter net generating capacity is about 889 MWe. The plant consumes  of coal per day, and requires  of cooling water per hour. When the generator first went into operation, it was the largest in the world measured in terms of the volume of steam produced.

Environmental impact
In 2006, the plant ranked the 70th among the large coal-fired plants in the United States on the list of worst SO2 polluters, having emitted  of sulfur dioxide per MWh of energy produced (27,987 tons of SO2 in 2006 altogether).
Since then, a wet limestone scrubber has been installed, which reduced sulfur dioxide emissions by about 95%.

See also

List of power stations in Tennessee

References

Energy infrastructure completed in 1967
Coal-fired power stations in Tennessee
Buildings and structures in Anderson County, Tennessee
Tennessee Valley Authority
1967 establishments in Tennessee